Rome Reborn is a paid virtual reality project consisting of apps and videos that allows users to experience a digital reconstruction of Rome at the peak of its civilization. The project produced five individual modules that showcase different monuments and locations in the city during 320 A.D. Two additional modules are under development with releases expected soon.

The project is regarded as a success among critics, with reviewers seeing it as an educational innovation for the archaeological field.

History
The idea for Rome Reborn initially came from virtual heritage scholar, Bernard Frischer, in 1974. After witnessing Italo Gismondi's miniaturized 3D model of Rome in the Museum of Roman Civilization, Frischer took interest in the possibility of recreating Rome in a virtual format.

The project was launched in 1996 under the development of the UCLA Cultural Virtual Reality Laboratory with Frischer as director. Version 1.0 was completed in 2007 and version 2.0 rolled out in 2008. This version received two subsequent updates with version 2.1 releasing in 2010 and version 2.2 releasing in 2012. The team completely reworked the software for the current 3.0 version, making it available to the public through virtual reality devices. It is currently available for Microsoft Windows, macOS, Oculus Rift, Oculus Go, Smasung GearVR, and HTC Vive. The project's budget is estimated to be around $3 million.

For their initial reconstruction of Rome, the University of Virginia development team used the existing physical 3D model of Rome from Gismondi. This allowed them to create their own digital 3D model of Rome which would then be digitally modeled to their standards. In total, the project was developed by roughly 100 people spanning Italy, the United States, Britain, and Germany.

Version 1.0's release was accompanied by a ceremony held on Rome's Capitoline Hill. It was attended by the Frischer, the Roman mayor, and many American researchers.

Modules

Flight over Ancient Rome
Users are positioned in a virtual hot air balloon overlooking the city of Rome that is transported to stationary locations. Frischer guides viewers through over 35 different locations in the city, providing commentary that gives historical context to each area. Some of the spaces included are the Circus Maximus, the tombs of Augustus and Hadrian, the Imperial Fora, the Forum, and the Colosseum. It serves as a general introduction into the city of Rome with its many landmarks.

The Roman Forum
The Roman Forum module lets users to traverse what was the center of Rome during 320 A.D. The free-roaming camera allows for up close looks at relatively detailed buildings, monuments, and statues located in the Forum. Some of the buildings included in the environment are the Temple of Castor and Pollux, the Temple of Antoninus and Faustina, the Basilica Aemilia, the Arch of Septimius Severus, the Temple of Vesta, the Curia Julia, the Basilica Julia, and the Arch of Augustus. It also includes the Rostra's statues of Pompey, Sulla, Camilius, and many other political figures from Rome's history.

An optional guided tour is provided by the Frischer if they wish to hear about the historical significance of the structures located in the Forum. Users are also presented with a "Time Warp" feature that switches the setting to the current day ruins.

The Basilica of Maxentius
The user is inserted into the final civic building of the Roman Empire before its Christianization, the Basilica of Maxentius. Smarthistory hosts, Beth Harris and Steven Zucker, provide users with a virtual tour of the building. The experience showcases 3D reconstructions of the painted marble walls, the barrel vaulted ceiling, and Constantine's 15 meter statue.

The Pantheon
The Pantheon is the most recent module to be released by this project. Users are able to tour a reconstructed visualization of one of Rome's most famous and well preserved temples. Just like the previous modules, this addition includes a virtual tour delving into the significance of the structure in 320 A.D.

The Colosseum district
Users can experience the district of the Flavian Amphitheater ("Colosseum") as well as its surrounding structures with an optional guided tour. The recreated structures in this module include the Colossus of the Sun, the Ludus Magnus, the Meta Sudans, the Temple of Venus and Rome, the Arch of Constantine, the Arch of Titus, and the Colosseum. The free-roaming camera allows for detailed looks at the recreated reliefs, architecture, and statues found in the district.

This virtual environment gives access to reconstructed sections of the Colosseum's underground chambers.

The Imperial Fora
The Imperial Fora had a projected release date of 2019, but is currently still under development. A virtual tour will provide information on its construction and influence from Julius Caesar, Augustus, Vespasian, Nerva, and Trajan.

The Imperial Palace
The Imperial Palace has a projected release date of 2020. Users will be able to visit the palace of the imperial family located on Palatine Hill.

Controversy
Frischer created the initial version of the project with the help of historians and 3D modellers from UCLA. Development on version 2.0 was then transferred to the University of Virginia where paid employees and students were tasked with the version's completion. Upon the release of version 2.0 in 2008, the project was free to download through a 3D Google Earth layer.

During version 3.0's development of an entirely new city model in the period 2009 to the present, Frischer shifted Rome Reborn towards a paid downloadable format, developed and copyrighted the program by his employee-owned business, which operates under the name Flyover Zone (www.flyoverzone.com).

In early 2019, it was alleged by Sarah Bond (who was not involved in any way with Rome Reborn) that members of the development team for Rome Reborn were subject to exploitation from Frischer. Former members of the development staff at UCLA and the University of Virginia were supposedly dissatisfied with the director using student labour and university funds to release a paid service under his own copyright. None were named and none have come forward to support this charge. As noted, the copyrighted 3.0 version of the Rome Reborn model was actually developed with private funds outside a university, so the allegation appears to have arisen from a misunderstanding. A concern was also raised about the occlusion of credit towards developers in the About section of the project's website. Frischer denied these charges in a reply (https://www.romereborn.org/content/comment-recent-criticism-social-media), pointing out that due credit to earlier developers had been given on the company's project website but had been missed by the critic. To prevent recurrence of this, he added more explicit mention on the About page of the project's website. Frischer also pointed out that version 3.0 of the Rome Reborn model, which is the one in commercial use, had been created entirely by private funding through his employee-owned company. Finally, Frischer noted that since 2007 he had taken steps to make the publicly financed versions of the Rome Reborn model freely available. Through the years it has had over three million views.

References

2007 works
Ancient city of Rome
Roman sites in Italy
Virtual reality works